Glenn Macaskill is an author currently living in South Africa, formerly a long-serving member of the BSA Police in Zimbabwe (previously Rhodesia). His works often contain strong political undertones, exemplified at times by graphic descriptions of atrocities committed by Robert Mugabe's Fifth Brigade.

Currently, Macaskill has only one published work: King's Gold.

External links 
 Glenn Macaskill

South African writers
Living people
Year of birth missing (living people)
Place of birth missing (living people)